Daniel Smith (7 September 1921 – 8 October 1998) was a Scottish professional footballer who played as a winger in the Football League.

References

Sources

1921 births
1998 deaths
Scottish footballers
Association football midfielders
West Bromwich Albion F.C. players
Chesterfield F.C. players
Crewe Alexandra F.C. players
Corby Town F.C. players
English Football League players
Newmains United Community F.C. players
People from Armadale, West Lothian